Quer may refer to:

People
 Jordi Quer (born 1970), Spanish rower
 José Quer y Martínez (1695–1764), Spanish physician and botanist
 Pius Font i Quer (1888–1964), Spanish botanist, pharmacist and chemist

Places
 Quer, Guadalajara, Spain

Other
 quer is the Portuguese word for "he/she/it wants/loves"